The Very Best of Frankie Valli & the Four Seasons is a 2002 compilation album featuring music from Frankie Valli during both his time fronting the Four Seasons and his solo career. It was released by Rhino Records. In June 2012 due to the success of Jersey Boys in Auckland, New Zealand the album went number one in New Zealand and was certified Platinum.  It has also sold over 500,000 copies in the US.

Track listing
 "Sherry"
 "Big Girls Don't Cry"
 "Walk Like a Man"
 "Candy Girl"
 "Dawn (Go Away)"
 "Ronnie"
 "Rag Doll"
 "Save It for Me"
 "Bye, Bye, Baby (Baby, Goodbye)"
 "Let's Hang On!"
 "Working My Way Back to You"
 "Opus 17 (Don't You Worry 'Bout Me)"
 "I've Got You Under My Skin"
 "C'mon Marianne"
 "Can't Take My Eyes Off You" - Frankie Valli
 "My Eyes Adored You" - Frankie Valli
 "Swearin' to God" (Single Version) - Frankie Valli
 "Who Loves You"
 "December, 1963 (Oh, What a Night)"
 "Grease" - Frankie Valli

References 

2002 greatest hits albums
The Four Seasons (band) albums
Rhino Records compilation albums